Scott Hoffman (born September 1, 1976), known by his stage name Babydaddy, is an American musician and the Ivor Novello Award-winning multi-instrumentalist, backing vocalist and composer for the U.S. glam rock band Scissor Sisters. He is the brother of comedian and musician Ben Hoffman.

Early life and education 
Born in Houston, Texas, to a Jewish family, Hoffman lived most of his childhood in Lexington, Kentucky, attending Henry Clay High School. He attended Columbia University, where he studied writing and music production and subsequently worked in the field of dance music. He graduated from Columbia in 1999.

Career 
He had previously met Jake Shears—then still known as Jason Sellards—through a childhood friend, and Hoffman asked Shears to provide vocals for his tracks. When Hoffman moved to New York to study writing at Columbia, the duo officially joined forces and took stage names to become the first two members of Scissor Sisters in 2001. At the time, the band was just a combination of Babydaddy's music and Shears's vocal and visual performances. The band logo was designed by Babydaddy.
Since then, the band has grown and recruited further members, in the process expanding its original musical style to cover the rock, disco and dance music genres.
Babydaddy plays a number of instruments including keyboards, guitar, bass and banjo; he and Shears are the main lyricists for the band. The two also wrote the hit single "I Believe in You" for Kylie Minogue, as well as the title track from her documentary White Diamond. Babydaddy has also co-produced with other artists including Tiga and Xavier and has produced remixes (alongside Jake Shears under the Scissor Sisters moniker) for Pet Shop Boys, The Ones and Blondie.
In 2010, Babydaddy remixed disco icon Amanda Lear's single "I'm Coming Up".

In 2016, Hoffman produced and co-wrote alongside Dev Hynes and Nicola Roberts "Ghetto Boy" for Tinashe's second studio album Nightride.

Discography

Personal life
Babydaddy is gay. He is the younger brother of comedian Ben Hoffman.

Sources 

 Babydaddy Interview on Silent Uproar
 Dallas Observer
 We Are Scissor Sisters... And So Are You

External links 

 Official Scissor Sisters website
 
 Underground Illusion - The Ultimate Scissor Sisters Database

1976 births
20th-century American male singers
20th-century American singers
American rock musicians
Columbia College (New York) alumni
Gay singers
Ivor Novello Award winners
Jewish American musicians
Gay Jews
LGBT people from Texas
Gay songwriters
American gay musicians
Living people
American LGBT singers
American LGBT songwriters
Musicians from Houston
Musicians from New York City
Musicians from Lexington, Kentucky
Scissor Sisters members
Songwriters from New York (state)
Songwriters from Kentucky
Singers from Kentucky
Rock musicians from Kentucky
Jewish rock musicians
21st-century American male singers
21st-century American singers
20th-century American LGBT people
21st-century American LGBT people
American gay writers